Heikant is a hamlet in the municipality of Reusel-De Mierden, in the Dutch province of North Brabant. It is located about 1 km north of Hulsel.

According to the 19th-century historian A.J. van der Aa, Heikant (or "De Heikant", "De Heykant") consisted of 8 houses and had a population of 50 in the middle of the 19th century.

References

Populated places in North Brabant
Reusel-De Mierden